The 2010 UK & Ireland Greyhound Racing Year was the 85th year of greyhound racing in the United Kingdom and Ireland.

Summary
Levy payments for greyhound racing went down again from £10 million to £8.5 million. Betting exchanges were impacting major bookmakers which in turn affected greyhound racing. Jimmy Lollie finished the year with a remarkable 35 open-race wins after winning the semi-final of the Scurry Cup at Belle Vue. Trained by Seamus Cahill the brindle dog went on to be voted greyhound of the year which was unusual for a sprinter. He was withdrawn from the final of the Scurry but did win the National Sprint, set four new track records  and passed 50 career wins.

Tracks
Portsmouth Stadium under the control of manager Eric Graham closed under controversial circumstances. Within weeks of the unsuccessful application for a lease renewal Graham stated that the company would be wound up with immediate effect.

There was a new track in Limerick when the Limerick Greyhound Stadium was opened in October by minister of agriculture, fisheries and food Brendan Smith. It was built on the site of the old Greenpark Racecourse costing €18 million. The Irish Greyhound Board's latest showpiece had the facilities and comforts of a world-class stadium. The new venue was also served by a new tunnel linking Clare and Limerick.

Competitions
Toomaline Jack was an unlucky loser in the Grand National final, the Dolores Ruth trained Irish entry set a new hurdle track record but went lame leaving Plane Daddy to win the first prize. The Greyhound Racing Association decline continued with open race prize money decreases including the St Leger; the event was won by Droopys Bradley.

News
Philip Rees Jr., a long-time successful Wimbledon trainer died aged 67. Champion trainer Mark Wallis joined Yarmouth from Harlow; Yarmouth had just undergone track improvements at the cost of £190,000. Matt Dartnall joined Swindon and Patrick Curtin joined Monmore. Seamus Cahill won his first trainers championship held at Doncaster and Carol Evans was sacked from Sheffield after being fined by the Greyhound Board of Great Britain following investigations into unusual betting patterns on Betfair accounts. A former leading on-course bookmaker Tony Morris died in March, aged 73.

Bad weather during December resulted in many meetings cancelled all over the country. The Henlow Gold Cup suffered when several attempts to run the event were cancelled. Elsewhere huge numbers of greyhounds were required to grade on again (re-qualify) at many tracks, after they ran out of time under the sport's 28 day rule. Temperatures on Boxing Day (daytime) meetings were held at temperatures of minus 7 Celsius and below.

Three former leading trainers Pam Heasman, Arthur Hitch and Terry Duggan all died (Heasman aged 85, Hitch and Duggan aged 77).

Roll of honour

Principal UK finals

+ track record
	

+ Track record

Principal Irish finals

+ Track record

References 

Greyhound racing in the United Kingdom
Greyhound racing in the Republic of Ireland
2010 in British sport
2010 in Irish sport